The annual MTV Videos Music Awards Latinoamérica were to be held Wednesday, October 19 at the Xcaret Park's Great Tlachco Theater in Playa del Carmen (close to Cancún), Quintana Roo, Mexico, for the first time in a different location since their creation. However, due to the approach of Hurricane Wilma towards the Mexican Riviera Maya, the show was moved from October 20 to the 19th, but it was eventually postponed. The date was then moved again, this time to December 22.

A couple of months later, MTV decided that it was not feasible to have the show on the aforementioned scheduled date. Instead, the awards were given out on a half-hour special called "Por Fin Los Premios MTV 2005" where the winners received their awards after having practical jokes played on them (a la Punk'd). Would-be hosts Molotov hosted this special and played live on a public concert in Playa del Carmen. A second special, called "Lenguas en Vivo: Ganadores en Concierto" (Tongues Live: Winners in Concert) aired that same day with some of the winners performing. Miranda! played from their studio in Argentina, two songs from Juanes's concert in Buenos Aires were also filmed by MTV for this special, and Panda and Reik also performed from MTV's studios in Mexico City. A third and final 1/2 hour special called "El Show que Wilma se Voló" was also broadcast that day showing how the show was supposed to happen and the reaction of the artists and MTV's workers after they found out about its cancellation.

Nominations
Winners in bold.

Artist of the Year
 Café Tacuba
 Diego Torres
 Juanes
 Miranda!
 Shakira

Video of the Year
 Juanes — "La Camisa Negra"
 Miranda! — "Don"
 Molotov — "Amateur"
 Shakira — "La Tortura (featuring Alejandro Sanz)"
 Shakira — "No"

Best Male Artist
 Alejandro Sanz
 Daddy Yankee
 Diego Torres
 Juanes
 Tiziano Ferro

Best Female Artist
 Andrea Echeverri
 Belinda
 Ely Guerra
 Paulina Rubio
 Shakira

Best Group or Duet
 Café Tacuba
 La Ley
 Miranda!
 Molotov
 Reik

Best Pop Artist
 Belinda
 Diego Torres
 Julieta Venegas
 Reik
 Shakira

Best Rock Artist
 Babasónicos
 Catupecu Machu
 Juanes
 Lucybell
 Moderatto

Best Alternative Artist
 Andrea Echeverri
 Belanova
 Miranda!
 Molotov
 Natalia y La Forquetina

Best Independent Artist
 La Etnnia
 Los Natas
  Panda
 Pornois
 Thermo
No public voting

Best Pop Artist — International
 Ashlee Simpson
 Backstreet Boys
 Gwen Stefani
 Hilary Duff
 Kelly Clarkson

Best Rock Artist — International
 Coldplay
 Foo Fighters
 Good Charlotte
 Green Day
 Simple Plan

Best Hip-Hop/R&B Artist — International
 50 Cent
 Beastie Boys
 The Black Eyed Peas
 Missy Elliott
 Eminem

Best New Artist — International
 Ashlee Simpson
 Gwen Stefani
 Kelly Clarkson
 My Chemical Romance
 The Killers

Best Artist — North
 Belanova
 Café Tacuba
 Moderatto
 Molotov
 Reik

Best New Artist — North
 Delux
 Elli Noise
 Mariana Ochoa
 Reik
 Thermo

Best Artist — Central
 Andrea Echeverri
 Juanes
 Kudai
 La Ley
 Shakira

Best New Artist — Central
 Andrea Echeverri
 Ciudad Satélite
 La Etnnia
 Kudai
 Los Píxel

Best Artist — South
 Árbol
 Babasónicos
 Bersuit Vergarabat
 Catupecu Machu
 Miranda!

Best New Artist — South
 Bahiano
 Cuentos Borgeanos
 Flavio y La Mandiga
 Lourdes
 Luciano Supervielle

Performances

Por Fin Los Premios MTV 2005
 Molotov — "Mamar"

Lenguas en Vivo: Ganadores en Concierto
 Reik — "Que Vida La Mía" and "Yo Quisiera"
 Miranda! — "Don"
 Panda — "Cita En El Quirófano"
 Juanes — "La Camisa Negra" and "Dámelo"

Memorable Moments
 The show being postponed twice and finally cancelled (due to the approach of Hurricane Wilma).

References

Latin American music
MTV Video Music Awards
2005 music awards